The Spyder MR1 is a MilSim paintball marker designed and manufactured by Kingman Group, now superseded by the Spyder MR2 and MR3 models.

Design

The Spyder MR1 is a mechanical marker. Much like its newer, electronic counterparts, the Spyder MR2, MR3 and E-MR1, it has an offset feedneck for rifle-like sighting, a 12 inch muzzle brake barrel, an anti-double feed detent to prevent double feeding.  Being a mechanical paintball marker, it features only semi-automatic rates of fire. It also has a two finger trigger (or double trigger) for faster firing and less fatigue.  It has two stock colors, matte black or matte olive and retails with a detachable stock.

E-MR1

E-MR1s are the electronic counterparts of the MR1s. They are upgraded with:
Electronic grips(E-grip), capable of firing 15  in 3 modes of operation: semi-automatic, full-automatic, and bursts
2-way adjustable triggers, adjustable to players's preferences
Delrin bolts
Removable adjustable shoulder stocks

E-MR1s are available in matte silver or matte olive.

MR1 Sniper

The MR1 sniper is a long range counterpart of the MR1. The MR1 sniper is rated higher than the original marker for its superior accuracy to countless other markers. The MR1 sniper features
a 16" barrel rather than a 12" on a standard model.

Features and specifications

MR1
Standard Features
Military Style Semi-Auto Paintball Marker
All Aluminum Constructed Body
Ergonomically Designed Aluminum Trigger Frame
Aluminum Magazine Style Fore-Grip
Standard Picatinny Rail (for Mounting Scopes or Sights)
Removable Composite Shoulder Stock
Durable Matte Anodized Finish
No-Slip Rubber Grip Panels
Quick Strip Delrin Bolt
12” Muzzle Break Barrel
Off-Set Feed Neck
Two Finger Trigger
Angled Bottomline with Drop Forward

E-MR1
3 Modes of Operation (Semi-Auto, Full-Auto & Burst)
Rate of Fire (R.O.F.) up to 15 BPS
Flux Wrap-Around Grip
2-Way Adjustable Two Finger Trigger
Removable Adjustable Shoulder Stock
Top Cocking Delrin Bolt
12” Muzzle Break Barrel
Off-Set Feed Neck
Integrated Dovetail Scope Mount
Drop Forward w/ Inline Screws
Anti-Double Feed Ball Detent
Steel Braided Hose Line
Durable Matte Anodized Finish
Quick Disconnect Pin
One Piece Velocity Adjuster/Spring Guide

MR1 Sniper
Military/ Sniper Style Semi-Auto Paintball Marker
All Aluminum Constructed Body
Ergonomically Designed Aluminum Trigger Frame
Aluminum Magazine Style Fore-Grip
Standard Picatinny Rail (for Mounting Scopes or Sights)
Removable Composite Shoulder Stock
Durable Matte Anodized Finish
No-Slip Rubber Grip Panelso
Quick Strip Delrin Bolt
16" Sniper barrel with muzzle break
Off-Set Feed Neck
Two Finger Trigger
Angled Bottomline with Drop Forward
Comes in black finish only

See also
Spyder Rodeo

External links
Kingman Group Official website
Spyder Paintball Official Spyder website
MR1 Schematics and Parts List By Kingman Group
Spyder Fenix By PaintballFuzz

Paintball markers